Beylik is a village in Zabukh village administrative territorial district of Lachin district of the Republic of Azerbaijan. Lachin district is located in the south-west of the Republic of Azerbaijan, in a mountainous area. It borders Kalbajar to the north, Khojaly, Shusha and Khojavand to the east, Gubadli districts to the south, and the Republic of Armenia to the west.

History 
Consisting of the components bey (title) and -lik (affiliation suffix), this oikonym means "village belonging to the groom". In 1933, a village called Beylik was registered in the Esrik administrative territorial unit of Kalbajar district. There are settlements of this name in the territory of Saatli and Agdash regions.

It was occupied by the Armed Forces of Armenia in 1992. According to the cease-fire declaration signed at the end of the Second Karabakh War in 2020, it was liberated from occupation by the Azerbaijani Armed Forces on December 1, 2020.

References

Populated_places_in_Kashatagh_Province
Populated_places_in_Lachin_District
Villages in Azerbaijan